Victoria Azarenka and Ágnes Szávay were the defending champions, but they did not compete in the Juniors this year.

Alisa Kleybanova and Anastasia Pavlyuchenkova defeated Kristina Antoniychuk and Alexandra Dulgheru in the final, 6–1, 6–2 to win the girls' doubles tennis title at the 2006 Wimbledon Championships.

Seeds

  Kristina Antoniychuk /  Alexandra Dulgheru (final)
  Alisa Kleybanova /  Anastasia Pavlyuchenkova (champions)
  Marrit Boonstra /  Caroline Wozniacki (quarterfinals)
  Sorana Cîrstea /  Alexandra Panova (semifinals)
  Ksenia Milevskaya /  Amina Rakhim (quarterfinals)
  Kristína Kučová /  Michaela Pochabová (first round)
  Sacha Jones /  Yanina Wickmayer (first round)
  Julia Cohen /  Kimberly Couts (quarterfinals)

Draw

Finals

Top half

Bottom half

References

External links

Girls' Doubles
Wimbledon Championship by year – Girls' doubles